Fukumoto (written: ,  or  in hiragana) is a Japanese surname. Notable people with the surname include:

, Japanese rower
Beth Fukumoto (born 1983), American politician
, Japanese anime director
, Japanese Marxist
, Japanese footballer
, Japanese high jumper
, Japanese footballer
, Japanese manga artist
, Japanese actor
, Japanese footballer
, Japanese water polo player
, Japanese footballer
, Japanese footballer
, Japanese baseball player

Japanese-language surnames